Flakey the robot was a research robot created at SRI International's Artificial Intelligence Center and was the successor to Shakey the robot.

Software
Most of Flakey's routines were written in Lisp, with some lower-level code written in C. The code maintains a "Local Perceptual Space" that is updated by the sensors and acted on by planning algorithms.

Hardware
It was about 3 feet tall and 2 feet wide, and included 12 sonar sensors, optical wheel encoders, a video camera, and a depth-finding laser.

Research results
Flakey was used to demonstrate fuzzy logic and goal-oriented behavior - it would take what it knew and work towards one of several goals. At the first AAAI robotics competition in July 1992, Flakey took second place and the University of Michigan's CARMEL took first, above Georgia Tech's "Buzz" and IBM's "TJ2".

References

SRI International
Historical robots
Rolling robots
Robots of the United States
1985 robots